Buletin FM (formerly Kool FM, stylised as buletin fm) is a Malaysian private radio station owned by Media Prima Berhad, which broadcasts in the Malay language. It was launched on 1 March 2016. It is the fourth radio station of the Media Prima company after 8FM, Fly FM, Hot FM and before Molek FM. The radio station is based on the acquisition of Copyright Laureate Sdn. Bhd. in October 2015, which owns Ultra FM and Pi Mai FM.

History 

Originally, Kool FM targeted listeners from the country's Generation X, with songs being played mostly from the 1980s and 1990s, but it also included some songs from the 2000s and 2010s. Depending on what they were playing, the name was based on the band Kool and the Gang.

On 6 January 2020, Kool FM changed its radio format into talk radio with the new tagline Suara Semasa, focusing on current affairs, social and community, and various talk and infotainment programmes retaining the same announcers, while playing 80s, 90s and current songs.

Beginning 4 May 2021, the station broadcast simultaneously on TV9, every day from 3:30 - 4:30 am.

Starting 2 August 2021, Kool FM was renamed as Buletin FM and rebranded as the most focused and credible news radio station, with Ally and Hawa (from Malaysia Hari Ini and Buletin Utama TV3 respectively) as the new announcers. Buletin FM will complement the TV3's news and current affairs programming and competes with Bernama Radio.

On 29 November 2021, Buletin FM broadcasts in Kuala Terengganu, Terengganu and Kota Bharu, Kelantan  were discontinued. It was replaced by Molek FM on 9 January 2022.

On 14 March 2022, Buletin FM changed its tagline again from "Info Terkini & Muzik Sepanjang Zaman" to "Isu Semasa dan Info Terkini".

From March 28, 2022, Buletin FM no longer broadcast temporarily through the MYTV platform.

Frequency

References

External links 
 
 

2016 establishments in Malaysia
Radio stations in Malaysia
Malay-language radio stations
Radio stations established in 2016
Media Prima